Emmanuel Banahene Osei (born August 16, 1988) is a Ghanaian footballer. Banahene is most comfortable in attacking roles, mainly striker, winger or offensive midfielder.

Career
Banahene started his career at Ghanaian side Stay Cool F.C. He then moved to International Allies, where he was part of the team which won the 3rd edition of the Mylik Classic U-19 Tournament, played between 27 and 29 November 2005 at Dansoman Park, Accra, Ghana. On June 3, 2006, Heart of Lions F.C. signed him to a 3-year contract. He was then bought by Israeli side Hapoel Petach Tikva in the summer of 2008. However, he received limited playing opportunities in first half of the 2008/2009 season and was subsequently loaned to lower-division side Ramata Shalon. At the end of his loan, in October 2009, he returned to Ghana to sign a new one-year contract with Heart of Lions F.C., starting a second stint at the club. In 2010, Banahene was sold again, this time to Berekum Chelsea, and then again the following year, to Turkish club Orduspor. In 2012, he was loaned to TFF First League team Giresunspor. In summer of 2012, he signed a one-year loan deal with Karşıyaka.On December 24, 2012, he terminated his agreement with Orduspor. In January 2015 he signed for Ismaily SC in a two and a half years deal.

On 26 June 2022, Banahene joined Saudi Arabian club Al-Zulfi. On 5 January 2023, Banahene was released.

References

External links
Theplayersagent profile
Inter Allies Profile

Emmanuel Banahene at Footballdatabase

1988 births
Living people
Ghanaian footballers
Ghana international footballers
Ghanaian expatriate footballers
International Allies F.C. players
Hapoel Petah Tikva F.C. players
Heart of Lions F.C. players
Orduspor footballers
Giresunspor footballers
Karşıyaka S.K. footballers
Şanlıurfaspor footballers
Al-Orobah FC players
Ismaily SC players
Al-Mina'a SC players
Al Ittihad Alexandria Club players
Al-Shoulla FC players
Al-Kawkab FC players
Al-Ansar FC (Medina) players
Al-Zulfi FC players
Saham SC players
Süper Lig players
TFF First League players
Liga Leumit players
Israeli Premier League players
Saudi Professional League players
Egyptian Premier League players
Saudi First Division League players
Oman Professional League players
Saudi Second Division players
Ghanaian expatriate sportspeople in Israel
Ghanaian expatriate sportspeople in Turkey
Ghanaian expatriate sportspeople in Egypt
Ghanaian expatriate sportspeople in Iraq
Ghanaian expatriate sportspeople in Saudi Arabia
Ghanaian expatriate sportspeople in Oman
Expatriate footballers in Turkey
Expatriate footballers in Israel
Expatriate footballers in Saudi Arabia
Expatriate footballers in Egypt
Expatriate footballers in Iraq
Expatriate footballers in Oman
Association football forwards